Peter Garland (born January 25, 1952 in Portland, Maine) is a composer, writer and publisher of Soundings Press.

A student of James Tenney and Harold Budd, much of Garland's work could be considered post-minimal although many of his postminimal works such as "The Days Run Away" (1971) were written in the early 1970s at the same time as the first minimalist works. He is also an expert on Native American music, and on the music of Silvestre Revueltas. He is the author of Gone Walkabout: Essays 1991-. Garland started his Soundings Press series in 1971 after attending a publishing workshop with Dick Higgins at CalArts.

Discography
1982 Matachin Dances (EP, Cold Blue)
1986 Peñasco Blanco (Cold Blue, reissued on Nana + Victorio, 1993)
1992 Border Music (¿What Next?, reissued on OO Disc, 2002)
1992 Walk in Beauty (New Albion)
1993 Nana + Victorio (Avant)
2000 The Days Run Away (Tzadik)
2002 Another Sunrise (Mode)
2005 Love Songs (Tzadik)
2008 Three Strange Angels (Tzadik) reissue of Border Music expanded with live recordings
2009 String Quartets (Cold Blue Music)
2011 Waves Breaking on Rocks (New World) 
2015 After the Wars  (Cold Blue Music) EP with Sarah Cahill
2017 The Birthday Party (New World)
2018 Moon Viewing Music (Inscrutable Stillness Studies #1) (Cold Blue Music)
2018 The Landscape Scrolls (Starkland)
2021 Three Dawns and Bush Radio Calling (Cold Blue Music)

Compilations
 "The Three Strange Angels" (1973), included on Cold Blue (1984, Cold Blue, CD release 2002)
 "Apple Blossom" included on Persistence of Past Chemistries (2000, The Orchard)
 "Dancing on Water" included on Dancing on Water (2001, Cold Blue)
 "Matachin Dances" (1982), included on The Complete Ten-Inch Collection from Cold Blue (2003, Cold Blue)
 "Nights in the Gardens of Maine" included on "Cold Blue Two" (2012, Cold Blue)

Other recordings of compositions by Garland
 Ensemble Bash – Launch (1996, Sony): "Apple Blossom" (1972)
 William Winant, Roy Malan, Carla Kihlstedt a.o. – Peter Garland: Love Songs (Tzadik, 2005): "Matachin Dances", "Coyote's Bones (Last Piece)", "Love Songs"

References

External links
Frog Peak Artist: Peter Garland
Other Minds: Peter Garland
Mode Artist Profile: Peter Garland
Peter Garland Papers and Soundings Records at the Harry Ransom Center at the University of Texas at Austin
Garland String Quartets

1952 births
20th-century classical composers
21st-century classical composers
American male classical composers
American classical composers
Living people
Musicians from Portland, Maine
Pupils of James Tenney
Tzadik Records artists
Writers from Portland, Maine
21st-century American composers
20th-century American composers
20th-century American male musicians
21st-century American male musicians